Stefano Casali (born 15 October 1962) is a Sammarinese racewalker. He competed in the men's 20 kilometres walk at the 1980 Summer Olympics and the 1984 Summer Olympics.

References

1962 births
Living people
Athletes (track and field) at the 1980 Summer Olympics
Athletes (track and field) at the 1984 Summer Olympics
Sammarinese male racewalkers
Olympic athletes of San Marino
Place of birth missing (living people)